Colonel Sir Arthur Percy Sherwood,  (March 18, 1854 – October 15, 1940) was the Commissioner of Police of the Dominion Police in Canada. 

Percy Sherwood was born in Ottawa and educated at the Ottawa Grammar School. 

Sherwood was instrumental in the development of intelligence and security in Canada in the late 19th century through the early 20th century. He was appointed Deputy Sheriff of Carleton County, June, 1877; Chief of Police of the City of Ottawa, April, 1870: Superintendent of Dominion Police, October, 1882 ; and Commissioner of same, November, 1885.  Chief Commissioner of Dominion Police (1885-1919).

Sherwood served in the militia of Canada with the Governor General's Foot Guards and eventually commanding the 43rd Duke of Cornwall's Own Rifles.

References

1854 births
1940 deaths
19th-century Canadian civil servants
Canadian Knights Commander of the Order of St Michael and St George
Canadian police chiefs
Lisgar Collegiate Institute alumni
Canadian Members of the Royal Victorian Order